The Communauté urbaine de Québec (also known as the Québec Urban Community) was a regional municipal body that existed in the area around Quebec City from 1970 to 2001.

Formation

Rationale for reorganization
In the late 1960s, the Government of Quebec saw increasing problems arising in the governance of the urban areas of Quebec City, Montreal and Hull because of the system of municipal organization in effect at that time:

 disparities between how municipalities were structured, in contrast with socioeconomic realities,
 unequal levels of service between different municipalities,
 disparities arising from the differences in local fiscal capacity,
 difficulties in local planning, and
 local parochialism that discouraged collective action.

The current remedies involving intermunicipal agreements, amalgamation and annexation were seen as being inadequate, as they were discretionary and piecemeal in nature. The Province opted to establish "urban communities" in all three areas, which would possess mandatory and optional powers appropriate to each. A particular concern in the Quebec area was the large presence of government agencies whose exemption from property taxes created a significant revenue shortfall to the municipalities, together with the need to strengthen intermunicipal cooperation to deal with the situation. This was confirmed in the debate on the implementing bill, where then Minister of Municipal Affairs Robert Lussier stated that the reform was "aimed at economies of scale through administrative centralization, and at reducing futile rivalries between municipalities." The move was supported by all MLAs in the Quebec area, including former Premier Jean Lesage and former Créditiste member Gaston Tremblay.

This was not the first consolidation effort the Province had undertaken at the local level, as local school boards had already gone through something similar in the early 1960s. Officials at the local level had already begun discussions as early as 1965 on possible ways to establish joint activities, but nothing concrete had emerged by the time the Province unveiled its draft bill in June 1969. Although Quebec City itself was favourable to the provincial proposal, there was significant opposition from the other municipalities in the area, but such tension tended to fade away over the five years following the CUQ's creation.

Creation

Effective January 1, 1970, the Communauté urbaine de Québec ("CUQ") was established, which governed the area surrounding Quebec City on the north shore of the St. Lawrence River. Together with the CUQ, the Commission de transport de la Communauté urbaine de Québec ("CTCUQ") and the Bureau d'assainissement des eaux du Québec Métropolitain ("BAEQM") were also established. Each of the three covered different groups of municipalities:

Evolution

In the years following the establishing of the CUQ, various changes occurred among the constituent municipalities:

 on July 1, 1970, Duberger amalgamated with Quebec
 on December 9, 1970, the Parish of L'Ancienne-Lorette was amalgamated with Sainte-Foy
 on January 1, 1971, Neufchâtel amalgamated with Quebec,
 on May 1, 1973, Quebec annexed Charlesbourg-Ouest
 On January 1, 1974, Bélair and Val-St-Michel amalgamated to form Val-Bélair
 on January 1, 1976, Charlesbourg-Est, Notre-Dame-des-Laurentides and Orsainville amalgamated with Charlesbourg, and Courville, Giffard, Montmorency, Sainte-Thérèse-de-Lisieux and Villeneuve, together with the Parish of Saint-Michel-Archange,amalgamated with Beauport
 on April 27, 1983, Saint-Félix-du-Cap-Rouge changed its name to Cap-Rouge

When the CUQ was created, the remaining territory of Quebec County was not affected, which included unorganized territory and the municipalities of Lac-Delage, Lac-Édouard, Saint-Dunstan-du-Lac-Beauport, Saint-Gabriel-de-Valcartier and Stoneham-et-Tewkesbury. In 1981, they were divided between the new regional county municipalities of Le Haut-Saint-Maurice and La Jacques-Cartier.

Governance

Council
The CUQ was governed by its council, which consisted of the mayor of each constituent municipality. It had a chairman and a vice-chairman, and, where a representative from Quebec City held one of the positions, the other had to be from one of the other municipalities.

Executive committee
It also had an executive committee, which had similar functions to a board of control found in Ontario. Its members were independently appointed for four-year terms by the constituent municipalities by sector:

Effective January 1, 1994, the executive committee was abolished, and the chairman, 1st vice-chairman and 2nd vice-chairman of the council were declared to be the Mayor of Quebec, a representative from Beauport, Charlesbourg or Sainte-Foy, and a representative from the remaining municipalities (in any order).

2002 municipal reorganization

Effective January 1, 2002, the CUQ, together with its constituent municipalities, were amalgamated to form the Ville de Québec, which subsequently became part of the new Communauté métropolitaine de Québec.

Further reading

Notes

References

Municipal government of Quebec City
Metropolitan areas of Quebec